Banjul United Football Club is a football club from Banjul in the West African, state of Gambia. They played in the GFA League First Division during the 2010 season, which is the highest league in Gambian football.  They currently play in the GFA League Second Division in 2014.  It is one of Banjul's newest sporting club. And their only title till date was the 2013/2014 GFF cup when they bet Hawks 1-0 in the final.

Stadium
Currently the team plays at the 3,000 capacity Banjul Mini-Stadium.

Achievements
Gambian Cup: 1
2014

Position
2014: 10th (Second Division)

References

External links
Soccerway

Football clubs in the Gambia
Banjul
Association football clubs established in 2010
2010 establishments in the Gambia